White Witch is the second studio album by the group Andrea True Connection, released in 1977 by Buddah Records. The album spawned two moderate hit singles: "N.Y., You Got Me Dancing" and "What's Your Name, What's Your Number". White Witch wasn't a commercial success and failed to enter any sales charts. It was the last album released by the group, and the vocalist Andrea True would later release only one solo album in 1980.

Background and production
After the success of her first album and the gold-certified single "More, More, More", the band began to prepare for their second release. The album production included studio musicians with a new band assembled for the tour, which included future Kiss guitarist Bruce Kulick. The material was co-produced by the disco pioneers Michael Zager and Jerry Love.

Singles
The first single from the album was "N.Y., You Got Me Dancing", released in early 1977, which became True's second biggest hit, reaching #27 on Billboards pop chart, and #4 on the club chart. It also peaked at #89 on the Canadian singles chart. "What's Your Name, What's Your Number" was released as the second and last single of the album (and also of the group) in late 1977. It reached #56 on the US pop chart, #9 on the club chart, and also #34 in the UK.

Critical reception

In a 1978 review, Billboard magazine referred to the album as "a mixed bag", describing most of the material as "pop-flavored, curiously carrying a late '60s feel", yet noting that the "[s]ound is perky, with useful keyboards, guitar and percussion work behind True's idiosyncratic vocals." In a retrospective mixed review, Alex Henderson from AllMusic gave the album two and a half out of five stars and wrote that "while White Witch isn't a bad album, it falls short of the excellence [of] her first album, More, More, More." He also stated that there are a few gems in the album, "including the Michael Zager-produced "What's Your Name, What's Your Number" and the exuberant, Gregg Diamond-produced "N.Y., You Got Me Dancing" – both of which are exercises in unapologetically campy fun." He concluded that the "LP is strictly for diehard disco collectors."

Track listing

References

External links
 Official audio on YouTube
 Andrea True Connection at Discogs

1977 albums
Andrea True albums
Buddah Records albums